Basel Evangelical Mission Higher Secondary School (BEM HSS, PALAKKAD) is an aided school in Palakkad city, Kerala, India. The school was established as an English School in May 1858, incorporated in 1859 by Rev. J. Strobel, a Missionary of Basel Evangelical Mission.

Location 
The school is located in the heart of Palakkad, Near KSRTC Stand, Kerala.

History 

The B. E. M. Higher Secondary School, Palakkad was established as an English School in May 1858 by Rev. J. Strobel, a Missionary of Basel Evangelical Mission. The First Headmaster of the School was Mr. Pothen. In 1860 it became an Anglo-Vernacular School. It was upgraded to a Middle School in 1864 and to a High School in 1905. It became a Higher Secondary School in the year 2000.

The main building of the school was constructed in 1910. This building is unique in architecture designed and constructed by T. Maue, a German Architect cum Missionary. There are no other school buildings in Kerala equal in architectural beauty to the BEM High School.

The BEM Higher Secondary School was one among the oldest schools in the Malabar District of the Madras Province at the time of its origin. It is the oldest school in the present Palakkad District of Kerala State.

The school is now governed by the Church of South India, the Chairman is K. P. Kuruvilla and the Corporate Manager is Paul David Thottathil. The Principal of the Higher Secondary Section is Thomas T Kuruvila and the Headmaster of High School is K Divakaran.

The school has catered to the educational needs of thousands of people since its inception. The admissions have been open to all without discrimination of religion, caste status in society.

Prominent alumni 
 Olappamanna
 T. N. Seshan 
 E. Sreedharan
 Shyamaprasad
 Unni Menon

References

External links 
 

Church of South India schools
Christian schools in Kerala
High schools and secondary schools in Kerala
Schools in Palakkad
Educational institutions established in 1858
1858 establishments in British India